The Philadelphia Phillies are a Major League Baseball team based in Philadelphia, Pennsylvania. They  are a member of the Eastern Division of Major League Baseball's National League. The team has played officially under two names since beginning play in 1883: the current moniker, as well as the "Quakers", which was used in conjunction with "Phillies" during the team's early history. The team was also known unofficially as the "Blue Jays" during the World War II era. Since the franchise's inception,  players have made an appearance in a competitive game for the team, whether as an offensive player (batting and baserunning) or a defensive player (fielding, pitching, or both).

Of those  Phillies, 82 have had surnames beginning with the letter G. No members of this list have been inducted into the Baseball Hall of Fame, but Dallas Green was elected to the Philadelphia Baseball Wall of Fame. In addition to being a Phillies pitcher in 1960, and again from 1964 to 1967, Green was named the Phillies manager in 1979 and led Philadelphia to the first World Series championship in franchise history in 1980. Though no Phillies on this list hold career franchise records, Kid Gleason does hold a single-season record; he won 38 games as a pitcher during the 1890 season before converting to a full-time second baseman later in his career.

Among the 50 batters in this list, second baseman Gid Gardner has the best batting average, at .667; he hit safely twice in three at-bats with the Phillies. Other players with an average above .300 include Dave Gallagher (.318 in one season), William Gallagher (.306 in one season), Mike Grady (.331 in four seasons), Billy Graulich (.308 in one season), and Emil Gross (.307 in one season). Tony González leads all batters on this list with 77 home runs and 438 runs batted in in nine seasons with Philadelphia.

Of this list's 33 pitchers, Geoff Geary has the best win–loss record by winning percentage; he won thirteen games and lost four in five seasons with the Phillies. Gleason's 78 career victories lead all pitchers in this list, as do his 70 losses. The earned run average (ERA) leader is left fielder Greg Gross, who made two pitching appearances during his ten-season career in Philadelphia, allowing no runs in five innings pitched; among pitchers, Gene Garber leads with a 2.68 ERA. Tommy Greene is one of the ten Phillies pitchers who have thrown a no-hitter, accomplishing the feat on May 23, 1991.

Footnotes
Key
 The National Baseball Hall of Fame and Museum determines which cap a player wears on their plaque, signifying "the team with which he made his most indelible mark". The Hall of Fame considers the player's wishes in making their decision, but the Hall makes the final decision as "it is important that the logo be emblematic of the historical accomplishments of that player’s career".
 Players are listed at a position if they appeared in 30% of their games or more during their Phillies career, as defined by Baseball-Reference. Additional positions may be shown on the Baseball-Reference website by following each player's citation.
 Franchise batting and pitching leaders are drawn from Baseball-Reference. A total of 1,500 plate appearances are needed to qualify for batting records, and 500 innings pitched or 50 decisions are required to qualify for pitching records.
 Statistics are correct as of the end of the 2010 Major League Baseball season.

References
General

Inline citations

G